The Petit lac Caotibi is a lake in Quebec, Canada.

Location

It is in the unorganized territory of Lac-Walker, Sept-Rivières Regional County Municipality, Quebec.
As of November 2021 the Commission de toponymie of Quebec had not determined the origin or meaning of the name.

Hydrology

The Petit lac Caotibi has an irregular shape, with a smaller western portion joining a larger eastern portion through a channel.
It is fed from the Grand lac Caotibi to the south, which in turn is fed from Lake Arthur.
It drains north into the Northeast Toulnustouc River.

Land use

The Cartier Railway runs along the east of the lake.
The line runs from Port-Cartier on the Gulf of St. Lawrence north past Petit lac Manicouagan to the Mont Wright mine, southwest of Labrador City.
On 22 August 1957 the Quebec government reserved an area of land  on each side of the railway and on each side of Grand Lac Caotibi and Petit Lac Caotibi, and including the lakes, on which mining claims could no longer be staked.

During public consultations on land use in the area held in 2016-2019, concerns were raised about maintaining the quality and productivity of the aquatic ecosystems of several strategic lakes in the wildlife reserve.
These were Grand lac Coatibi, Lake Arthur and Lac du Nord-Est.
Access to the south of Petit lac Caotibi for conservation purposes was requested.

Notes

Sources

Lakes of Côte-Nord